Meningococcal vaccine refers to any vaccine used to prevent infection by Neisseria meningitidis. Different versions are effective against some or all of the following types of meningococcus: A, B, C, W-135, and Y. The vaccines are between 85 and 100% effective for at least two years. They result in a decrease in meningitis and sepsis among populations where they are widely used. They are given either by injection into a muscle or just under the skin.

The World Health Organization recommends that countries with a moderate or high rate of disease or with frequent outbreaks should routinely vaccinate. In countries with a low risk of disease, they recommend that high risk groups should be immunized. In the African meningitis belt efforts to immunize all people between the ages of one and thirty with the meningococcal A conjugate vaccine are ongoing. In Canada and the United States the vaccines effective against four types of meningococcus (A, C, W, and Y) are recommended routinely for teenagers and others who are at high risk. Saudi Arabia requires vaccination with the quadrivalent vaccine for international travellers to Mecca for Hajj.

Meningococcal vaccines are generally safe. Some people develop pain and redness at the injection site. Use in pregnancy appears to be safe. Severe allergic reactions occur in less than one in a million doses.

The first meningococcal vaccine became available in the 1970s. It is on the World Health Organization's List of Essential Medicines.

Inspired by the response to the 1997 outbreak in Nigeria, the WHO, Médecins Sans Frontières, and other groups created the International Coordinating Group on Vaccine Provision for Epidemic Meningitis Control, which manages global response strategy. ICGs have since been created for other epidemic diseases.

Types
Neisseria meningitidis has 13 clinically significant serogroups, classified according to the antigenic structure of their polysaccharide capsule. Six serogroups, A, B, C, Y, W-135, and X, are responsible for virtually all cases of the disease in humans.

Quadrivalent (Serogroups A, C, W-135, and Y)
There are three vaccines available in the United States to prevent meningococcal disease, all quadrivalent in nature, targeting serogroups A, C, W-135, and Y:
 three conjugate vaccines (MCV-4), Menactra, Menveo and MenQuadfi. The pure polysaccharide vaccine Menomune, MPSV4, was discontinued in the United States in 2017.

Menveo and MenQuadfi are approved for medical use in the European Union.

Menactra and Menveo
The first meningococcal conjugate vaccine (MCV-4), Menactra, was licensed in the U.S. in 2005 by Sanofi Pasteur; Menveo was licensed in 2010 by Novartis. Both MCV-4 vaccines have been approved by the Food and Drug Administration (FDA) for people 2 through 55 years of age. Menactra received FDA approval for use in children as young as 9 months in April 2011 while Menveo received FDA approval for use in children as young as two months in August 2013. The Centers for Disease Control and Prevention (CDC) has not made recommendations for or against its use in children less than two years.

MenQuadFi
MenQuadFi, manufactured by Sanofi Pasteur, was approved by the US Food and Drug Administration (FDA) on 23 April 2020, for use in individuals 2 years of age and older.

Menomune
Meningococcal polysaccharide vaccine (MPSV-4), Menomune, has been available since the 1970s. It may be used if MCV-4 is not available, and is the only meningococcal vaccine licensed for people older than 55. Information about who should receive the meningococcal vaccine is available from the CDC.

Nimenrix

Nimenrix (developed by GlaxoSmithKline and later acquired by Pfizer), is a quadrivalent conjugate vaccine against serogroups A, C, W-135, and Y. In April 2012 Nimenrix was approved as the first quadrivalent vaccine against invasive meningococcal disease to be administered as a single dose in those over the age of one year, by the European Medicines Agency. In 2016, they approved the vaccine in infants six weeks of age and older, and it has been approved in other countries including Canada and Australia, among others. It is not licensed in the United States.

Mencevax
Mencevax (GlaxoSmithKline) and NmVac4-A/C/Y/W-135 (JN-International Medical Corporation) are used worldwide, but have not been licensed in the United States.

Limitations
The duration of immunity mediated by Menomune (MPSV-4) is three years or less in children aged under five because it does not generate memory T cells. Attempting to overcome this problem by repeated immunization results in a diminished, not increased, antibody response, so boosters are not recommended with this vaccine. As with all polysaccharide vaccines, Menomune does not produce mucosal immunity, so people can still become colonised with virulent strains of meningococcus, and no herd immunity can develop. For this reason, Menomune is suitable for travellers requiring short-term protection, but not for national public health prevention programs.

Menveo and Menactra contain the same antigens as Menomune, but the antigens are conjugated to a diphtheria toxoid polysaccharide–protein complex, resulting in anticipated enhanced duration of protection, increased immunity with booster vaccinations, and effective herd immunity.

Endurance
A study published in March 2006, comparing the two kinds of vaccines found that 76% of subjects still had passive protection three years after receiving MCV-4 (63% protective compared with controls), but only 49% had passive protection after receiving MPSV-4 (31% protective compared with controls). As of 2010, there remains limited evidence that any of the current conjugate vaccines offer continued protection beyond three years; studies are ongoing to determine the actual duration of immunity, and the subsequent requirement of booster vaccinations. The CDC offers recommendations regarding who they feel should get booster vaccinations.

Bivalent (Serogroups C and Y)
On 14 June 2012, the FDA approved a combination vaccine against two types of meningococcal disease and Hib disease for infants and children 6 weeks to 18 months old. The vaccine, Menhibrix, prevents disease caused by Neisseria meningitidis serogroups C and Y and Haemophilus influenzae type b. This was the first meningococcal vaccine that could be given to infants as young as six weeks old.

Serogroup A
A vaccine called MenAfriVac has been developed through a program called the Meningitis Vaccine Project and has the potential to prevent outbreaks of group A meningitis, which is common in sub-Saharan Africa.

Serogroup B

Vaccines against serotype B meningococcal disease have proved difficult to produce, and require a different approach from vaccines against other serotypes. Whereas effective polysaccharide vaccines have been produced against types A, C, W-135, and Y, the capsular polysaccharide on the type B bacterium is too similar to human neural adhesion molecules to be a useful target.

A number of "serogroup B" vaccines have been produced. Strictly speaking, these are not "serogroup B" vaccines, as they do not aim to produce antibodies to the group B antigen: it would be more accurate to describe them as serogroup independent vaccines, as they employ different antigenic components of the organism; indeed, some of the antigens are common to different Neisseria species.

A vaccine for serogroup B was developed in Cuba in response to a large outbreak of meningitis B during the 1980s. This vaccine was based on artificially produced outer membrane vesicles of the bacterium. The VA-MENGOC-BC vaccine proved safe and effective in randomized double-blind studies, but it was granted a licence only for research purposes in the United States as political differences limited cooperation between the two countries.

Due to a similarly high prevalence of B-serotype meningitis in Norway between 1974 and 1988, Norwegian health authorities developed a vaccine specifically designed for Norwegian children and young adolescents. Clinical trials were discontinued after the vaccine was shown to cover only slightly more than 50% of all cases. Furthermore, lawsuits for damages were filed against the State of Norway by persons affected by serious adverse reactions. Information that the health authorities obtained during the vaccine development were subsequently passed on to Chiron (now GlaxoSmithKline), who developed a similar vaccine, MeNZB, for New Zealand.

A MenB vaccine was approved for use in Europe in January 2013. Following a positive recommendation from the European Union's Committee for Medicinal Products for Human Use, Bexsero, produced by Novartis, received a licence from the European Commission. However, deployment in individual EU member countries still depends on decisions by national governments. In July 2013, the United Kingdom's Joint Committee on Vaccination and Immunisation (JCVI) issued an interim position statement recommending against adoption of Bexsero as part of a routine meningococcal B immunisation program, on the grounds of cost-effectiveness. This decision was reverted in favor of Bexsero vaccination in March 2014. In March 2015 the UK government announced that they had reached agreement with GlaxoSmithKline who had taken over Novartis' vaccines business, and that Bexsero would be introduced into the UK routine immunization schedule later in 2015.

In November 2013, in response to an outbreak of B-serotype meningitis on the campus of Princeton University, the acting head of the Centers for Disease Control and Prevention (CDC) meningitis and vaccine preventable diseases branch told NBC News that they had authorized emergency importation of Bexsero to stop the outbreak. Bexsero was subsequently approved by the FDA in February 2015 for use in individuals 10 through 25 years of age. In October 2014, Trumenba, a serogroup B vaccine produced by Pfizer, was approved by the FDA for use in individuals 10 through 25 years of age.

Serogroup X
The occurrence of serogroup X has been reported in North America, Europe, Australia, and West Africa. There is no vaccine to protect against serogroup X N. meningitidis disease.

Side effects
Common side effects include pain and redness around the site of injection (up to 50% of recipients). A small percentage of people develop a mild fever. A small proportion of people develop a severe allergic reaction. In 2016 Health Canada warned of an increased risk of anemia or hemolysis in people treated with eculizumab (Soliris). The highest risk was when individuals "received a dose of Soliris within 2 weeks after being vaccinated with Bexsero".

Despite initial concerns about Guillain-Barré syndrome, subsequent studies in 2012 have shown no increased risk of GBS after meningococcal conjugate vaccination.

Travel requirements

Travellers who wish to enter or leave certain countries or territories must be vaccinated against meningococcal meningitis, preferably 10–14 days before crossing the border, and be able to present a vaccination record/certificate at the border checks. Countries with required meningococcal vaccination for travellers include The Gambia, Indonesia, Lebanon, Libya, the Philippines and, most importantly and extensively, Saudi Arabia for Muslims visiting or working in Mecca during the Hajj or Umrah pilgrimages. For some countries in African meningitis belt, vaccinations prior to entry are not required, but highly recommended.

References

Further reading

External links
 
 
 
 
 
 
 
 
 

 
GSK plc brands
Novartis brands
Sanofi
World Health Organization essential medicines (vaccines)
Wikipedia medicine articles ready to translate